Nicholas George Mohammed (born 4 October 1980) is an English actor, comedian and writer. He is best known for his character Mr. Swallow, which he has portrayed across both stage and television for over a decade. Outside of the United Kingdom, Mohammed is best known for portraying the character of Nathan "Nate The Great" Shelley in the Apple TV+ series Ted Lasso, for which he was nominated in the Outstanding Supporting Actor in a Comedy Series category at the 73rd and 74th Primetime Emmy Awards.

Early life
Mohammed was born on 4 October 1980 in Leeds, West Yorkshire. His mother was a Cyprus-born general practitioner and his father was an Indo-Trinidadian legal professional. He was educated at Abbey Grange High School. He reportedly turned down an offer from Cambridge University and chose Durham University, where he was a member of St Aidan's College and played violin in the university orchestra. He had auditioned for the Durham Revue twice but failed to get in and instead frequented the local comedy circuit. His interest in comedy prompted him to audition for the Footlights, which he did successfully.

Career
Mohammed has featured in the second series of BBC One's Reggie Perrin and was a co-presenter in BBC Three comedy series The King Is Dead alongside Simon Bird and Katy Wix. He has made guest appearances in Pete & Dud: The Lost Sketches, Miranda, How Not to Live Your Life and Life's Too Short, and has appeared in one episode of the BBC Radio 4 musical comedy show Alex Horne Presents The Horne Section.

Following his hit BBC Radio 4 debut (Quarters), Mohammed's second series Nick Mohammed in Bits attracted further critical acclaim. Mohammed was a cast member of BAFTA-nominated CBBC sketch show Sorry, I've Got No Head and supported Angelos Epithemiou (as one of his radio show characters, Mr. Swallow) on his 2010 national tour. He has had a supporting role in all three seasons of C4 comedy series Drifters. Mohammed has also developed The Mr. Swallow Show for BBC Television and is writing and starring in an original comedy-drama Magic for Channel 4 as part of the Coming Up Scheme. He also appears in the new CBBC show Hank Zipzer as Mr. Love. He made a guest appearance in the final episode of series 1 and first episode of series 2 of Uncle.

In 2015, he joined the cast of ITV comedy The Job Lot. He has written and starred in two series of 'Detective Sergeant Nick Mohammed', a comedy set in a police station, for BBC Radio 4.

In 2018, he voiced Piglet in the Disney film Christopher Robin. In 2018, it was announced that he would collaborate on a new comedy series titled Intelligence with David Schwimmer for Sky One.

In 2019, Mohammed appeared in the second series of Stath Lets Flats, and in 2020, Mohammed starred as Nate in the Apple TV+ series Ted Lasso.

In 2021, it was announced Mohammed will star as a police officer in the film Maggie Moore(s), joining Jon Hamm and Tina Fey.

Filmography

Film

Television

Awards and nominations

References

External links

  Nick Mohammed on Spotlight

1980 births
Living people
20th-century English male actors
21st-century English male actors
Alumni of Magdalene College, Cambridge
Alumni of St Aidan's College, Durham
English comedians
English male film actors
English male television actors
English male voice actors
Male actors from Leeds
People from West Yorkshire
English people of Indo-Trinidadian descent
English people of Cypriot descent